Anthony Peterson (born March 16, 1985) is a professional boxer. He is the younger brother of Lamont Peterson.

Amateur career
Peterson had an outstanding amateur career, and was the 2003 National Golden Gloves Lightweight Champion. In 2004 he lost twice to Mexican American Vicente Escobedo at 132 lbs, which cost him his place in Athens. He and brother Lamont also won the Junior Olympic National Tournament in the amateurs.

Professional career
Peterson turned pro in 2004 and has won 32 of his 33 professional fights, including 21 by way of KO.

On June 26, 2008, Peterson defeated Fernando Trejo by unanimous decision. Peterson was in command for the entire fight as he logged scores of 120-108, 120-108, and 119-109 from the judges in winning the NABF interim lightweight title.

On September 11, 2010 Peterson faced the undefeated Mexican American prospect Brandon Rios in a WBA title eliminator fight. Peterson lost the bout by disqualification in the 7th round due to repeated illegal low blows. Rios was leading on all three scorecards before the stoppage.

On December 10, 2011, Peterson defeated the Nigerian journeyman Daniel Attah on the Amir Khan vs. Lamont Peterson undercard at Walter E. Washington Convention Center, Washington, D.C., winning by unanimous decision.

On May 18, 2013, Peterson defeated Dominic Salcido on the Lucas Matthysse vs Lamont Peterson undercard at Boardwalk Hall, Atlantic City by winning by TKO on the 2nd round.

Professional boxing record

References

External links

1985 births
Living people
National Golden Gloves champions
Boxers from Washington, D.C.
American male boxers
African-American boxers
Lightweight boxers
Light-welterweight boxers
Doping cases in boxing
21st-century African-American sportspeople
20th-century African-American people